Walter B. Brady of Detroit was a member of the Michigan State House of Representatives from Wayne County 1st District from 1927 to 1932.

References

1870 births
Year of death missing
Politicians from Detroit
Republican Party members of the Michigan House of Representatives